James Allan Hawkins (born April 1954) is an English painter and film maker associated with Scottish Highland landscape. He lives, works and exhibits at his open studio RhueArt in Rhue, three miles North of Ullapool.

Early life

Hawkins was educated at Monkton Combe School, Bath. He went on to study at Wimbledon School of Art, London and Ruskin School of Drawing, Oxford University. After graduating he moved to the Highlands of Scotland in 1978 with his wife Flick.

Career

His early work was figurative and mostly painted outside, on-location on the West coast of Scotland. After a commission in 1986 to produce stage sets for a production of The Brahan Seer at Eden Court Theatre, Inverness his work became larger and semi abstract. He exhibited at the 369 Gallery, Edinburgh during the 1980s and in 1989 he won Warwick Arts Trust prize. In 1996 his paintings were part of Heartlands an overview of Scottish landscape painting at the City Art Centre, Edinburgh. Commissioned to paint large polytych for Inverness airport in 2004. In 2005 he began making short video films about nature’s microcosm. In 2012 Hawkins has broken away from his traditional medium or acrylic on stretched canvas and started working with carbon fiber and core board to create freestanding irregular shaped cut-out pieces.

Style

Hawkins work has always concentrated on landscape. Early paintings were figurative painted in watercolour on location. After he turned to acrylic his practice became increasingly studio based but with reference to frequent camping and walking trips throughout Scotland. The work has been abstract at times and representational at others a progression that the artist describes as "being like climbing a spiral staircase, by turns arriving at a similar point but from a different perspective". The surfaces of the paintings are complex and textured the artist applying paint with large painting knives and pieces of board. Most recently he has been making cut out paintings, fragments of landscape that are freestanding irregular shapes mounted on carbon fiber.

Solo exhibitions

2012 Cutting Edge, RhueArt in Cork Street London
2009 Chronicles of the straight line Ramblers Club, London
2007 Water, Wind and Light, Kilmorack Gallery, Beauly
2006 Atlantic Coast, Duff House Scottish National Galleries, Banff
2003 Way Out West, Davies and Tooth, London
2002 Kilmorack Gallery Beauly
2001 Art on the Links, St Andrews
1999 Landscape, Colour and Light, Davies and Tooth, London
1998 A Journey in all Weathers, Davies and Tooth, London
1997 Inferences, Bellevue Gallery, Edinburgh
1996 Duncan R Millar Fine Arts, Glasgow
1993 Coventry Gallery, London
1992 Sacred Sights, C.Boyd Gallery, Galashiels
1991 Sense of Place, 369 Gallery, Edinburgh
1990 Gallerie Van Alom, Berlin
1989 Gallery 202 London
1987 Landmarks, 369 Gallery, Edinburgh
1983 McLean Art Gallery, Greenock

Group exhibitions

 2011 Perception, RhueArt at Dovecot Studios, Edinburgh; Scottish Housing Expo, Inverness
 2009 Glasgow Art Fair
 2008 Thompson's Galleries, Aldeburgh, London
 2005 Millennium Institute, University of the Highlands and Islands; Kilmorack Gallery, The Gallery, Cork Street, London; Art’05 London Contemporary Art fair
 Scottish Exhibition, Richmond Hill Gallery, London
 2004 Thompson's Gallery Aldeburgh, London; Kilmorack Gallery, Beauly
 2003 Summer Exhibition, City Art Centre, Edinburgh
 2002 International Art Fair, New York; Exhibition, Fort Lauderdale, Florida USA
 2001 Art'01 London Contemporary Art Fair
 2001 Living the Land, Duff House, Scottish National Galleries, Banff
 1997 Lineart’97, International Art Fair, Ghent
 1996 ART 96, London Contemporary Art Fair
 1996 Glasgow Art Fair
 1996 Heartland, 20th Centaury Scottish Landscapes, Edinburgh
 1995 ‘Prints for the Western Isles’, Gulbenkian Foundation
 1991 Mountain Experience, Highland Region Touring Exhibition
 1989 Scottish Landscape, 369 Gallery National Touring Exhibition; Into the Highlands, McManus Gallery, Dundee
 1988 Light and Space, Crawford Arts Centre, St Andrews; Tenth Anniversary Exhibition, 369 Gallery Edinburgh; Artravaganza, Smith Gallery, Stirling
 1987 Seven Artists’ View of Iona, 369 Gallery Edinburgh
 1986 McLean Biennial, Greenock
 1978 369 Gallery, Edinburgh
 1975 Balliol College, Oxford

Film and video
 2008 ambiEnt Festival, Brescia, Italy
 2007 A Series of Fortunate Events, Inverness City Centre; Royal Scottish Academy Summer Exhibition, Edinburgh; Water, Wind and Light, Kilmorack Gallery, Beauly
 2006 Atlantic Coast, Duff House, Scottish National Galleries, Banff
 2005 Dreaming Spires, Edinburgh
 2001 Highland Festival ‘Elements’, Animation Collaboration
 1986 Biston Betularia, performance/ video

Awards and Commissions

 2004 The Great Glen, Inverness Airport
 1998 Scottish Art, GlenFiddich Distillery, Dufftown
 1989 Painter of the Year, Warwick Arts Trust, London
 1986 The Brahan Seer, Eden Court Theatre, Inverness
 1976 Painting Prize, Ruskin School of Drawing, Oxford University

Collections

 Buchanan Ingersoll, London
 City Art Centre, Edinburgh City Council
 Denton Wilde Sapte, London, Brussels, Paris
 The Fleming Collection, London
 Gallery of Modern Art, Glasgow
 Highland Council
 Highland Regional Council
 Paintings in Hospitals, Scotland
 Prudential plc
 The Royal Bank of Scotland
 Warwick Arts Trust

References

External links

 Official James Hawkins Website
 Official James Hawkins Agent Website

1954 births
Living people
English contemporary artists
20th-century English painters
English male painters
21st-century English painters
21st-century English male artists
Landscape artists
People educated at Monkton Combe School
Alumni of the Ruskin School of Art
Alumni of Wimbledon College of Arts
20th-century English male artists